The 2016–17 season was Brentford's 127th year in existence and third consecutive season in the Championship. The club also participated in the FA Cup and League Cup. The season covers the period from 1 July 2016 to 30 June 2017.

Season review

July
Brentford began the 2016–17 season with various transfers. Captain Jake Bidwell joined arch-rivals Queens Park Rangers for an undisclosed fee on 1 July. However, on the same day, Brentford also brought in three new players: Daniel Bentley, John Egan, and Romaine Sawyers after their contracts at their respective clubs expired. On 8 July, defender Jack O'Connell joined Sheffield United for an undisclosed fee. Later that day, Brentford kicked off their first pre-season friendly against Boreham Wood. A late Lewis Macleod header could not prevent defeat for the Bees as they lost 2–1. On 9 July, Brentford travelled to Germany for a 7-day pre-season training camp. During their time there, Brentford played VfL Bochum and won 1–0 thanks to a first half Scott Hogan goal. On 19 July, goalkeeper David Button joined local rivals Fulham for an undisclosed fee. Brentford continued their pre-season with a trip to Wycombe Wanderers. New signing Egan scored his first goal for the club before the break but Dayle Southwell equalised with a header in the second half, leaving the final score as 1–1. The first home game of the season was against 1. FC Kaiserslautern on 23 July. On a very hot day, Brentford took the lead after Alexander Ring inadvertently headed the ball into his own net in the second half. However, minutes later, Brentford conceded an equaliser from Róbert Pich to make the score 1–1. Just three days later, Brentford welcomed Peterborough United to Griffin Park. Paul Taylor scored for the Posh early on after a Tom Field mistake, but despite dominating the rest of the game, Brentford could not beat the opposition goalkeeper. On 30 July, Brentford announced the season-long loan of Callum Elder from Leicester City as a replacement for Bidwell at left back. Elder made his first appearance for the club in a testimonial match against Millwall to honour former captain Tony Craig. The match finished 1–1 after Yoann Barbet's early free kick was cancelled out by Steve Morison's header. Brentford's pre-season concluded with only one win from six matches.

August
Forward Lasse Vibe was called up for Denmark in the 2016 Summer Olympics and so would miss Brentford's first few games of the season. Brentford began their Championship campaign away to Huddersfield Town where they finished their previous season. Elias Kachunga put the hosts in front in the first half with Nico Yennaris equalising after coming off the bench in the second half. However, substitute Kasey Palmer scored the winner after a good Bentley save. On 8 August, midfielder Akaki Gogia joined Dynamo Dresden on a season long loan. The following day, Brentford announced the signing of Emmanuel Ledesma, who had been training with The Bees during pre-season, on a non-contract basis. He was available for the EFL Cup First Round tie against League Two side Exeter City. In a disappointing display, Brentford suffered a 1–0 defeat after extra time thanks to a good Ryan Harley finish from inside the penalty box. Brentford made amends with a convincing 2–0 victory against Ipswich Town with Egan scoring both goals on his home competitive debut and also Sam Saunders' 200th competitive game for the club. Brentford's second home league game of the season finished 1–0 against Nottingham Forest. Hogan scored his first goal of the season after Stephen Henderson saved his and Macleod's earlier efforts. Despite going a man down, Forest finished the game on top, with Bentley keeping out a last minute one-on-one effort from Britt Assombalonga to secure all three points. Vibe returned to Brentford's lineup in their next game against Rotherham United. While Brentford had played some promising football, they could not unlock the opposition defence and succumbed to a 1–0 defeat after conceding a dubious Danny Ward goal which had appeared offside. A week later, Brentford hosted Sheffield Wednesday at Griffin Park. Wednesday dominated the first half and was unlucky to not be ahead by half-time. It would be Brentford that broke the deadlock first in the second half after a clearance by goalkeeper Keiren Westwood cannoned off the onrushing Vibe and bounced into the net. Both teams went down to 10 men after David Jones received a second yellow card for dissent while the goalscorer Vibe also received a second yellow card. In the dying minutes, and with Brentford camped outside their box, Wednesday equalised as Sam Hutchinson headed in a Barry Bannan free kick.

It was a busy transfer deadline day for Brentford with one departure and two new arrivals. Ledesma left the club to join Greek side Panetolikos after being informed that he would not be offered a contract. Left back Rico Henry joined from Dean Smith's previous club Walsall on a five-year contract for an initial fee of £1.5 million that could rise to over £5 million in add-ons. Winger Sullay Kaikai joined on loan from Crystal Palace until the end of the season. Also on transfer deadline day, midfielder Ryan Woods signed a new four-year contract to extend his stay until 2020.

September 
After the international break, Brentford travelled down to the south coast to play Brighton & Hove Albion. In a hard-fought match, Hogan scored his first goal after racing away from the Brighton back line to slot home in the first half. Brentford's defence had to work hard to shut out the Seagulls with Egan having to clear a header off the line. Hogan's left foot finish high into the net from an angle made sure the Bees took home the three points. On 14 September, Brentford travelled to Villa Park to face Aston Villa for the first time in over 60 years. Villa appeared to be coasting to a win after new signing Jonathan Kodjia fired in a stunning curler in the first half but Brentford dug deep and, in the 88th minute, Egan fired in the equaliser with the help of two deflections to give Brentford a share of the points. Brentford then returned to Griffin Park to face Preston North End. It was a tight match in the first half with Hogan's left foot finish after Sawyers' through ball the only goal separating the two sides at the break. However, Preston collapsed after Dean fired in from a corner. The Lilywhites had to finish the game with 10 men when Marnick Vermijl was forced off due to injury with all their substitutions having already been made. Preston conceded 3 goals in almost as many minutes with Hogan completing his hat-trick and Chris Humphrey scoring an own goal. The match ended 5–0 to the Bees. Brentford's next match was against Wolverhampton Wanderers which finished 3–1 against the Bees. João Teixeira scored a brace with the first one coming after Josh McEachran was dispossessed in the Wolves half and the second one a free kick that found its way into the net after a dubious decision by the referee to penalise Woods. Kaikai's first goal for the club was not enough to rescue a point for the visitors as Ivan Cavaleiro slotted under Bentley late on. Brentford's impressive home form continued with a 4–1 drubbing of Reading. Josh Clarke scored his first goal for the Bees after a lovely passing move with Vibe adding to the scoreline just before half-time. After the break, Maxime Colin also netted his first goal for the club with a high finish from an angle. Yann Kermorgant gave Reading some hope with a converted penalty after Yennaris tripped Stephen Quinn but it was not to be for the R's as Hogan netted his 7th goal of the season after McEachran's cute pass on the edge of the box.

Hogan won the Championship Player of the Month award for September after scoring 6 goals in 5 matches.

October 
Brentford extended their home unbeaten run to 10 games with a goalless draw against Wigan Athletic. After the international break, Brentford made the journey north-east to face promotion favourites Newcastle United. Ciaran Clark nodded in the opener with Dwight Gayle also scoring within the first quarter of an hour as well as early in the second half. While Hogan netted his 8th goal of the season, it only proved to be a consolation to a much better side. Brentford's next match came against Derby County where a solid defensive display meant the game finished 0–0. On 20 October, midfielder Alan McCormack was charged for "using abusive and/or insulting words towards a match official" which "included a reference to gender" during a Cardiff City match in April. McCormack was suspended for five matches and fined £6,000 as well as being ordered to attend a training course. Brentford celebrated their 4000th English Football League match at Griffin Park against Barnsley but failed to win against the South Yorkshire club. Adam Armstrong's placed finish after Barbet's attempted clearance following a free kick gave Barnsley the lead in the first half. Sam Winnall tapped home after Ryan Kent's shot rebounded off the inside of the post to secure the win. Brentford travelled to Loftus Road to face Queens Park Rangers in the first West London derby of the season. Clarke wriggled around the defenders in the box from McEachran's pass and slotted the ball under goalkeeper Alex Smithies just before half-time to give the Bees the lead. Brentford doubled their lead after Colin found Sawyers free on the edge of the box. With a wonderful first time, left foot finish, Sawyers grabbed the winner in what was a well deserved 2–0 victory. Shortly after the goal, Macleod was stretchered off with a knee injury. It was later found that it was a significant injury which would require surgery and that Macleod would be out of action for the rest of the season.

November 

Brentford hosted Fulham for another West London derby, a week after defeating Queens Park Rangers. The Bees could not find the form they showed against Q.P.R. as they suffered a 2–0 defeat. Sone Aluko tapped in the opening goal in the first half after his initial shot was saved by Bentley. Button, who had left Brentford for Fulham in the summer, was rarely tested in goal. As Brentford were pushing for an equaliser, Tom Cairney scored Fulham's second goal on the break late into stoppage time to seal defeat for the Bees. After the international break, Brentford travelled to Ewood Park to face Blackburn Rovers. It was a frantic match with Hogan scoring within the first minute before Danny Graham scored twice in quick succession to bring the match into Blackburn's favour. Hogan scored his second soon after to level the score but a deflection from Dean into his own net proved to be the winner as Blackburn won 3–2. Brentford's dismal November continued back at Griffin Park against Birmingham City. Despite dominating the game, Brentford fell to a 2–1 defeat after a penalty from former Bee Clayton Donaldson and a goal from Ryan Shotton midway through the second half. Blues' keeper Tomasz Kuszczak had a fine game with a string of good saves while Vibe had a shot blocked on the line. Hogan's header was merely a consolation goal as Brentford finished November with no points from 3 games.

New crest 
On 10 November, Brentford announced their new crest that would be used from the start of the 2017/18 season. Featuring a circular crest and a more modern, clean look, the design was loosely based on the crest used from 1972 to 1975.

Transfers & loans

Transfers in

Loans in

Transfers out

Loans out

Players released

Pre-season
On 3 May 2016, Brentford announced their pre-season schedule for the upcoming 2016–17 campaign. Brentford will travel to North West Germany for a training camp from 9 to 15 July which includes a friendly against VfL Bochum on 13 July. Brentford will also play a testimonial match against Millwall for former captain Tony Craig who had played 127 games for Brentford.

Championship

League results summary

Results and position by round

League table

Matches
On 22 June 2016, the fixtures for the forthcoming season were announced.

League Cup

On 22 June 2015, Brentford were beaten 1:0 by Exeter City in the First Round of the EFL Cup.

FA Cup

First team squad
Players' ages are as of the opening day of the 2016–17 season.

Source: soccerbase.com
Italic: denotes player is no longer with team

Coaching staff
Last updated 8 December 2016

Kit
On 22 July, the kit for the 2016–17 season was revealed. The kit sponsor was changed from matchbook.com, the previous season's sponsor, to 888sport, an online bookmaker. Adidas remained as the kit supplier.

|
|
|
|
|
|

Statistics

Appearances and goals

Last Updated 7 May 2017

|}
Source: brentfordfc.co.uk
Italic: denotes player is no longer with team

Goalscorers

Source: brentfordfc.co.uk
Italic: denotes player is no longer with team

Disciplinary record

Last Updated 7 May 2017

Source: brentfordfc.co.uk
Italic: denotes player is no longer with team

Management

Summary

References

Brentford
Brentford F.C. seasons